Norma Haydee Calderón Arias (born 4 April 1967) is a Honduran politician. She currently serves as deputy of the National Congress of Honduras representing the Liberal Party of Honduras for Cortés.

References

1967 births
Living people
People from Cortés Department
Deputies of the National Congress of Honduras
Liberal Party of Honduras politicians
21st-century Honduran women politicians
21st-century Honduran politicians